The Faberge Egg is a 2022 Russian crime comedy film directed by Ilya Farfel. It is scheduled to be theatrically released on February 10, 2022.

Plot 
The film will tell about two old friends who find themselves at the bottom of life and they decide to fulfill their dreams. For this, they need to steal a Fabergé egg from the museum. But things didn't go the way we'd like.

Cast

References

External links 
 

2022 films
2020s Russian-language films
2020s crime comedy films
Russian crime comedy films
Russian adventure comedy films